Kaala  is a 2018 Indian Tamil-language action drama film written and directed by Pa. Ranjith, and produced by Dhanush under his production house Wunderbar Films. The film stars Rajinikanth in the titular role alongside Nana Patekar, Samuthirakani, Eswari Rao, and Huma Qureshi who appear supporting roles.

The film was announced in 2016 and was earlier scheduled to be released on 27 April 2018 but was postponed to June due to the standoff between Nadigar Sangam and Digital Service Providers on the increase of Virtual Print Fee charges along with the 2018 Tamil Nadu protests for Kaveri water sharing issue which also led to the delay in release of other Tamil films. Kaala premiered in Malaysia on 06 June 2018, followed by a release in 1,800 theatres in India on 07 June 2018 during the week of Eid-ul Fitr. Kaala is the first Indian film ever to be released in Saudi Arabia, following the country lifting its ban on public theatres in December 2017.

Plot 
In Mumbai, the people who had migrated from southern Tamil Nadu are living as majority in the slum of Dharavi. Haridev "Hari Dhadha" Abhayankar, previously a gangster who had carried out attacks in Dharavi in the 1980s, repeatedly tries to evict the people of Dharavi and seize their land. Over the years, he becomes an MP and later a Union Minister. By 2015, Dharavi becomes the central spot of downtown Mumbai. Hari plans to clear the area to construct posh buildings using his construction company in the form of government schemes with the help of his party supporter Vishnu Bhai.

Karikaalan, godfather of the people living in Dharavi, opposes Hari's plans as he wants to protect the area and his people. His ex-lover Zareena returns to her native Dharavi as a representative NGO that hopes to improve the living standards in Dharavi, unbeknownst of Hari's intentions. Despite many attempts by Hari's men, Kaala does not permit evacuation of the slum. Kaala is arrested after his wedding anniversary party, and then is assaulted in the police station in front of Hari and State Minister. The next day, Kaala is released. While he is returning home, Hari's assassination attempt on Kaala, in order to take control of the area, kills Kaala's wife Selvi and second son Selvam. Kaala then decides to take revenge on Hari.

Hari threatens the people in Dharavi by creating problems, but Kaala encourages the people to protest against the government in order to give up the scheme. Kaala and his people campaign through social media, and within two weeks, the State government cancels Hari's "Clean Mumbai Initiative." Humiliated, Hari creates a curfew in Dharavi with the aid of SP Pankaj Patil. Along with some policemen and Hari's right-hand man, Inspector Sunil, they raid the area. Kaala, his younger son Lenin, daughter-in-law Puyal, and brother-in-law Vaaliyappan also fight alongside him against Hari's henchmen and the police. The police believe Kaala is dead after his chawl is set ablaze.

Pankaj gets arrested after a video taken by a reporter named Praveen during the curfew provides evidence that the henchmen were brought into Dharavi to create problems with police's support. They inform the media, but the people of Dharavi deny the news of his death. Hari again enters Dharavi at a function for constructing a new building. Here, he begins to hallucinate Kaala's appearance among the crowd and behaves erratically. He is then killed by the people of Dharavi in a riot, and the government again cancels the scheme. With Dharavi's success, many slums start to follow Kaala's way of protest to protect their neighborhood, irrespective of their illegal occupation of lands.

Cast 

 Rajinikanth as Karikaalan "Kaala", from Tirunelveli, the head of the Tamil people of Dharavi who wants to protect the area and his people.
 Nana Patekar as Haridev "Hari Dhadha" Abhayankar, a ruthless minister who killed Kaala's father Vengaiyan.
 Eswari Rao as Selvi Karikaalan, Kaala's wife who gets killed in a car accident orchestrated by Hari Dhadha.
 Huma Qureshi as Zareena, Kaala's ex-girlfriend and a slum clearance builder from Africa who returns to Dharavi.
 Samuthirakani as Vaaliyappan, Selvi's brother.
 Anjali Patil as Charumathi (Puyal), Lenin's girlfriend and a member of 'Vizhithiru' group.
 Manikandan as Lenin, Kaala's youngest son and the founder of 'Vizhithiru' group who does not believe in his father's violent methods.
 Dileepan as Selvam, Kaala's second son and a main goon of Kaala but gets killed by goons organised by Hari Dhadha.
 Nitish Veera as Kathiravan, Kaala's eldest son who acts as a strong-man for his father's gang.
 Vikram as Kaala's third son
 Aruldoss as Mani, the MLA of Dharavi.
 Aravind Akash as Sivaji Rao Gaekwad, a police constable.
 Sayaji Shinde as Maharashtra Minister
 Sampath Raj as Vishnu Bhai, a local MLA and Hari Dhadha's silent goon.
 Ravi Kale as Inspector Sunil, Hari Dhadha's henchman.
 Pankaj Tripathi as SI Pankaj Patil, a corrupt police official on Hari Dhadha's payroll.
 Arundhati as Kaala's daughter-in-law.
 Sakshi Agarwal as Kaala's daughter-in-law.
 Suganya as Kaala's daughter-in-law.
 Ramesh Thilak as Praveen, a TV reporter who supports Kaala and was responsible for carrying out Pankaj's arrest.
 Bikramjeet Kanwarpal as Manu Constructions Builder
 Dopeadelicz as Dharavi resident
 Kanna as Beemji, a Dharavi resident
 "Nakkalites" Chella, a Dharavi resident
 Suryakanth as MLA Candidate
 Anitha Sampath as Newsreader
 Vishalini as Devi
 Supergood Subramani
 Shan as Shan
 Ashwanth Thilak as a background dancer in song "Thanga Sela"

Production

Pre Production 
Following the commercial success of Rajinikanth-starrer Kabali (2016),  Rajinikanth was reportedly signed for his next project backed by Dhanush's Wunderbar Films, collaborating with the actor for the first time. Vetrimaaran narrated a script to Dhanush, who set up a meeting for Vetrimaaran to discuss the script with Rajinikanth. The actor liked the script, but later turned down the offer as he felt the script was too political. Later, Rajinikanth approached Pa. Ranjith to work on a script for the former. After the actor and the producer were impressed with Ranjith's script, the latter was hired to helm the project.

Development 
Dhanush announced that he had signed Rajinikanth and Ranjith to work on a new film for his production house, Wunderbar Films during late August 2016.  Refuting reports that the film would be a sequel to Kabali, Dhanush announced that production would begin during mid-2017 following the completion of Rajinikanth's work for Shankar's science fiction film 2.0 (2018). In early May 2017, the producers received an open letter from Sundar Shekar Mishra, the foster son of gangster Haji Mastan, threatening that the makers should not depict his father in negative light and if they did, they would face consequences. In reply, Ranjith denied the film was a biopic of Haji Mastan and clarified that the film was based on fictional events, while revealing that Rajinikanth would play a man from Tirunelveli who escapes to Mumbai as a child and goes on to become a powerful don living in Dharavi slums. The title of the film, Kaala was announced in late May 2017, with promotional posters carrying the film's first look released.

Casting 
Following the announcement of the film, Wunderbar Films sought to cast Vidya Balan in a leading role, but the actress turned down the offer. Actress Huma Qureshi was later added to the cast in early May 2017 to feature in a role opposite Rajinikanth. Marathi actress Anjali Patil also announced that she would be playing an important role in the film through a post on her official Twitter account. Several members of the technical crew of Kabali were retained for Kaala, with A. Sreekar Prasad replacing Praveen K. L. as the film's editor during its pre-production stage. Bollywood actor Nana Patekar has been signed to play a politician who is the antagonist. For the role of Kaala's wife, Kasthuri was considered before Easwari Rao was confirmed. Dileepan of Vathikuchi fame is playing as one of the sons of Rajnikanth and Huma Qureshi is playing Zareena, Rajnikanth's ex-girlfriend. It was rumoured that Mammootty was signed in to play the role of Ambedkar in the film, but was proved to be untrue. Dopeadelicz, a rap team from Dharavi, joined the film.

Filming 
Shooting of this film started on 28 May 2017 at Mumbai and the lead actor Rajinikanth participated in this first schedule. It was known that the film was shot at real locations in Mumbai, including Dharavi, CTS and Grant Road. Due to heavy rains in Mumbai, the team had taken a break and erected a set at Chennai with Mumbai as its backdrop.

Anand Mahindra, chairman and managing director of Mahindra Group, was interested in the jeep which was used in the first look poster of this movie. He tweeted that he would love to acquire that jeep for his company's auto museum. The Mumbai schedule of the film, was completed on 29 June 2017. It was also known that the second schedule of the film has been affected due to a strike organised by Film Employees Federation of South India, which has been completed.

Music 

The soundtrack was composed by Santhosh Narayanan in his second collaboration with actor Rajinikanth after Kabali and his fourth collaboration with director Pa. Ranjith after Attakathi,  Madras and Kabali. The soundtrack album consists of nine songs written by Kabilan, Umadevi, Arunraja Kamaraj, Arivu, Dopeadelicz, Logan and Roshan Jamrock. The audio launch event of Kaala took place on 9 May 2018, at YMCA College of Physical Education, Chennai and the songs were simultaneously released on all streaming platforms.

Release 
There were many speculations regarding the release date of Kaala, which is known that the film is scheduled to release before 2.0, another Rajinikanth-starrer. In February 2018, the film's producer Dhanush, announced that the film is scheduled to release on 27 April 2018. However, the film's release was postponed due to the standoff between Nadigar Sangam and Digital Service Providers, on the increase of Virtual Print Fee charges, followed by the 2018 Tamil Nadu protests for Kaveri water sharing issue.

The film was released on 7 June 2018, with the Central Board of Film Certification receiving a U/A certificate, with 14 cuts and a runtime of 166 minutes. The film was released in more than 1,800 theatres in India. Kaala was released in more than 700 screens in Tamil Nadu. It recorded lowest advance bookings, a first time for a Rajinikanth starrer. Kaala is the first Indian film ever to be released in Saudi Arabia, following the country lifting its ban on public theatres in December 2017.

The film was dubbed and released in Telugu and Malayalam languages under the same name, and in Hindi as Kaala Karikalan.

Marketing 
The film's title poster was launched in four languages - English, Hindi, Tamil and Telugu on 24 May 2017. The first look posters featuring Rajinikanth, were released on 25 May 2017. On 12 December 2017, coinciding with Rajinikanth's 67th birthday, the makers unveiled a new poster from Kaala.

The official Instagram page for Kaala was launched on 28 February 2018. The film's official teaser was supposed to be released on 1 March 2018. But the teaser was delayed, as in order to pay tribute to Jayendra Saraswati Shankaracharya, following his demise, and the teaser was uploaded on YouTube, the same day midnight. The teaser which released in Hindi, Tamil, Malayalam and Telugu, got 14 million views, within its release. As of May 2018, the teaser crossed 25 million views.

The official merchandise of Kaala was launched by Cover It Up on 4 May 2018. A new Hindi poster, of Kaala was released on 19 May 2018. A contest was announced by the makers, for their fans to dress up like Kaala, and take a picture of it, and post it on twitter using the hashtag #IamKaala, and tagging the, official account of production house, where the lucky winners, would get the official merchandise of the film. The makers released a new Twitter emoji for Kaala, becoming the second South Indian film, to do so, after Mersal (2017). The official trailer of Kaala was released on 28 May 2018. The makers released a set making video of the Dharavi backdrop in Chennai on 1 June 2018. The film's pre-release event took place at Novotel in Hyderabad on 4 June 2018.

After Kabali (2016), multiple brands join once again with Kaala, which includes Airtel, Cadbury 5 Star, Nippon Paint and Havells. Airtel announced exclusive caller pack, and a new Airtel sim card, imprinted with a still of Rajinikanth from the film. The company had also made essential requirements, to stream the audio launch and trailer, through the Airtel TV app, and also a ticket contest, was held for fans. Nippon Paint launched a new contest called "Shades of Kaala", through their official Facebook page, through which the fans can get couple passes and floppies.

Controversies 
K. Rajashekaran of GSR Vinmeen Creations filed a case claiming the title of this film against Pa Ranjith, Rajnikanth and Dhanush. His allegation was that he had registered the title Kaarikalan with the South Indian Film Chamber of Commerce. In response, Wunderbar Films filed a counter-affidavit saying the story was written by Pa Ranjith and the title Kaala is registered by M/s Mini Studio, a sister concern of Wunderbar Films, with Tamil Film Producers Council on 24 May 2017.

The film's release in Karnataka, was ultimately stalled, because of Rajinikanth's statement over the Cauvery Water Sharing Issue, as a state from the Karnataka Film Chamber of Commerce. The film's distributor's office in Karnataka, was destroyed by pro-Kannada activists, regarding the issue, and was released in Karnataka, after high court order. Kaala's release was banned in Norway and Switzerland after Rajinikanth's comments about the Sterlite Issue, regarding the anti-social elements.

Reception

Critical response 

The film received positive reviews from critics. The Times of India rated the film 3.5 out of 5 and stated that Ranjith owes to his excellent technical crew for "helping him visualise and deliver this 51% Rajini-49% Ranjith movie". The Indian Express rated the movie 3.5 out of 5 and said that "Ranjith stays true to his objective. The traces of what we saw in Kabali have been fleshed out and beautifully embellished". NDTV rated the movie 3 out of 5 stars and stated that Kaala is out and out a director's film with a strong political core. Rajinikanth, in a toned-down avatar, is a bonus.'.  Meanwhile, The Hindu criticized the movie for its political elements and rated the film 2 out of 5, stating "an underwhelming film made for Rajinikanth, the politician. It’s difficult to think of Kaala as a film that was written for a star who claims to have had no political ambitions at the time. Now that he has become a politician, it’s Rajni the superstar that we long to see". The Hindustan Times gave its ratings as 4 out of 5 for the movie, stating "Rajinikanth lends his voice to Pa Ranjith’s political viewpoint".

Box office
The film collected  at the worldwide box office in the first weekend. The film collected  in the international box office. It also collected  for its global distributors, who shelled out  on its theatrical rights.

Awards and nominations

Notes

References

External links 
 

2018 films
Films set in Mumbai
Films shot in Mumbai
Films scored by Santhosh Narayanan
2010s Tamil-language films
2018 action drama films
Indian action drama films
Films directed by Pa. Ranjith